Wildcat Stadium may refer to one of the following sports stadiums in the United States:
Entries are listed alphabetically by state
 Wildcat Stadium (Fort Valley, Georgia), home football field of Fort Valley State University
 Wildcat Stadium (Louisiana), multi-sport stadium of Destrehan High School in Destrehan, Louisiana
 Wildcat Stadium (Louisiana College), multi-purpose stadium in Pineville, Louisiana
 Wildcat Stadium (University of New Hampshire), in Durham, New Hampshire, formerly known as Cowell Stadium and Lewis Field 
 Anthony Field at Wildcat Stadium, in Abilene, Texas, home football field of Abilene Christian University
 Wildcat Stadium (Rising Star, Texas),  see List of six-man football venues in Texas
 Wildcat Stadium (Weber State), in Ogden, Utah, now known as Stewart Stadium
 Wildcat Memorial Stadium, in Oak Harbor, Washington, multi-sport home field of Oak Harbor High School (Washington)

See also
 Wildcat Field (League City, Texas), on the campus of Clear Creek High School
 Bobcat Stadium (disambiguation)